This is a summary of 1912 in music in the United Kingdom.

Events
date unknown
 The Birmingham Triennial Music Festival is held for the last time, and runs at a loss.
Edward German declines Sir Herbert Beerbohm Tree's proposal that he provide the music for a production based on the life of Sir Francis Drake, saying that its setting necessitate covering ground already explored in his 1902 opera Merrie England. He writes little original music after this time.
The Royal Academy of Music moves from Mayfair to purpose-built premises in Marylebone.

Popular music
Jack Judge & Harry H. Williams – "It's A Long Way To Tipperary"

Recordings
Harry Lauder – Roamin' in the Gloamin' (Victor Talking Machine Company)

Classical music
Kenneth J. Alford – Holyrood and The Vedette, marches
Granville Bantock – In the Far West, serenade for string orchestra
Arthur Bliss – F. 139, Intermezzo
Frank Bridge – Piano Quintet
George Butterworth – Bredon Hill and Other Songs
Edward Elgar – The Music Makers
John Ireland – Songs of a Wayfarer
Charles Villiers Stanford – Sonata for clarinet (or viola) and piano, Op. 129

Opera
Joseph Holbrooke – The Children of Don, Op. 56

Musical theatre
24 February – The Sunshine Girl, with music by Paul Rubens, opens at the Gaiety Theatre, London, for a run of 336 performances.

Births
27 March – Robert Hughes, composer (died 2007)
22 April – Kathleen Ferrier, contralto (died 1953)
18 June – Melville Cook, organist, conductor, composer and teacher (died 1993)
30 June – Polly Ward, singer and actress (died 1987)
22 November – Chick Henderson, singer (died 1944)
7 December – Daniel Jones, composer (died 1993)
30 December (in Canada) – Rosina Lawrence, actress, singer and dancer (died 1997)
date unknown – Tommy Potts, fiddle player and composer (died 1988)

Deaths
30 January – Florence St. John, singer and actress, 56
1 March – George Grossmith, comic singer in operetta, 64
15 April (drowned in the sinking of RMS Titanic):
Wallace Hartley, ship's bandleader and violinist, 33
John Law Hume, violinist, 21
14 August – Marion Hood, singer, 58
1 September – Samuel Coleridge-Taylor, composer, 37 (pneumonia)
1 October – Frances Allitsen, composer, 63
19 October – Richard Temple, opera singer, 66

See also
 1912 in the United Kingdom

References

British Music, 1912 in
Music
British music by year
1910s in British music